Sreenagar is an upazila of Munshiganj District in the Division of Dhaka, Bangladesh.
Division of Dhaka

Geography
It has 36344 households and total area 202.98 km2.

Demographics
As of the 1991 Bangladesh census, Sreenagar has a population of 205797. Males constitute 49.88% of the population, and females 50.12%. This Upazila's eighteen up population is 99514. Sreenagar has an average literacy rate of 39.1% (7+ years), and the national average of 32.4% literate.

Administration
Sreenagar Upazila is divided into 14 Union Parishads: Atpara, Baghra, Baraikhali, Bhagyakul, Birtara, Hasara, Kolapara, Kukutia, Patabhog, Rarikhal, Sholaghar, Shyamsiddhi, Sreenagar, and Tantar. The union parishads are subdivided into 102 mauzas and 147 villages.

See also
Upazilas of Bangladesh
Districts of Bangladesh
Divisions of Bangladesh

References

Upazilas of Munshiganj District